The Dragon (Sumerian: Ušum or Ushum) was one of the warriors slain by Ninurta, patron god of Lagash, in Sumerian religion. Its body was hung on the seat of his chariot according to the ancient source.

See also
 Anzû, a massive bird whose death was sometimes credited to Ninurta
 Bashmu ("venomous serpent"), killed by Ninurta
 Mušmaḫḫū ("distinguished serpent"), killed by Ninurta
 Seven-headed serpent, killed by Ninurta
 Ušumgallu ("great serpent")

References

External links
 The Electronic Text Corpus of Sumerian Literature 

Characters in Mesopotamian mythology